This is a list of NCAA Division I men's basketball players who have accumulated both 2,000 points and 1,000 rebounds in their careers. Tom Gola, whose career at La Salle was between 1951–52 and 1954–55, also holds an NCAA men's basketball record: his 2,201 rebounds are the most ever.

Key

List

Footnotes

References
General

Specific

NCAA Division I men's basketball statistical leaders